Auzouville-sur-Saâne (literally Auzouville on Saâne) is a commune in the Seine-Maritime department in the Normandy region in Northern France.

Geography

Population

Places of interest
 The nineteenth century church of St. Denis.
 A Manorhouse dating from the fifteenth century.

See also
Communes of the Seine-Maritime department

References

Communes of Seine-Maritime